Fusco Nunatak is the westernmost of the Wilson Nunataks, located just west of Hercules Inlet, at the southeastern extremity of the Heritage Range, Antarctica. It was named by the Advisory Committee on Antarctic Names for aviation electrician Thomas A. Fusco, U.S. Navy, an air crewman on the first flight from McMurdo Station to Plateau Station, December 13, 1965.

References

Nunataks of Ellsworth Land